Cyprus facial neuromusculoskeletal syndrome is a rare autosomal dominant genetic disorder characterized by a "mephistophelian" appearance consisting of a ridged, thick triangular skin fold extending from the glabella up into the anterior fontanel, alongside other symptoms such as hypertelorism, widow's peak, low-set ears, kyphoscoliosis congenita, congenital clubfoot, hip dislocation, and arthrogryposis. Additional findings include cataracts, decreased articular range of motion, ptosis, and ankylosis, and, less commonly, mild sensory deficits with muscle weakness and atrophy. It has been described in a large 3-generation Greek Cypriot family.

References 

Congenital disorders of musculoskeletal system
Autosomal dominant disorders
Cutaneous congenital anomalies
Rare genetic syndromes